Vahan Mkhitaryan (born 16 August 1996) is an Armenian swimmer. He competed in the men's 50 metre freestyle event at the 2016 Summer Olympics. He finished 47th in the heats and did not qualify for the semifinals. He was the flag bearer for Armenia during the Parade of Nations.

References

1996 births
Living people
Armenian male freestyle swimmers
Olympic swimmers of Armenia
Swimmers at the 2016 Summer Olympics
Place of birth missing (living people)
Swimmers at the 2014 Summer Youth Olympics